Wuchuan (Mongolian:   Üčuvan siyan), is a county of Inner Mongolia Autonomous Region, North China, it is under the administration of the prefecture-level city of Hohhot, the capital of Inner Mongolia. It is connected to Hohhot by the Huwu Highway; roughly a half-hour's drive. Zhaohe Grasslands, a popular tourist site, is nearby.

Ancient History

According to the earliest records, the name Wuchuan comes from the "Book of Zhou" (周书), dating from 398 AD, and the "History of the North" (北史). Human activity can be traced back as far as 10,000 years.

The archaeological site at Daqingshan (大青山) village includes many artefacts from the Dayao Culture (大窑文化) and proves that the area was suitable for human habitation at that time. Another Paleolithic site at Erdaowa (二道洼) Village has an estimated age of 10,000 years. Many stone tools were found there, including knives, cutters and axes, indicating that the occupants of the area were hunter-gatherers.

A more recent site from 5000 BC was found at Jinergou (井儿沟). Better stone tools and pottery were unearthed. The tools were of types used for building, harvesting and making clothes, proving that agriculture was already well established at that time.

In the Three Sovereigns and Five Emperors period (五帝时期), about 2800BC, many tribes settled at Wuchuan. These included the Yunzhou (荤粥), Shefang (舌方), Tufang (土方) and Guifang (鬼方). The Yellow Emperor's war against Yunzhou was recorded in the Records of the Grand Historian by Sima Qian. During the Shang and Zhou Dynasties, King Wu of Zhou (武王) fought against the Guifang tribe many times, finally winning the battle after 3 years; an event which is recorded in the I Ching.

Around 302BC, Wuchuan belonged to the State of Zhao (赵国), one of the Warring States. The king of Zhao defeated Hulinloufan and built a wall near Daqing Mountain to stop the advance of the northern tribes. This event was recorded in the "Water Jingzhu" (水经注). The wall is now called the South Daqing Mountain Great Wall. Wuchuan also plays a role in the history of the Qin Dynasty and the Han Dynasty, especially the Battle of Changping (长平之战) of Zhao Kuo (赵括). During this time, Wuchuan was controlled by the Xiongnu, a nomadic people famous for their bronzes and animal carvings. A Xiongnu dagger together with some knife-shaped coins from the State of Yan were unearthed at Tuchenzi Village, indicating that cultural exchanges between the Xiongnu and the Han Chinese were very extensive at that time. A total of more than 20 ancient tombs of the Qin and Han period have also been discovered in Wuchuan.

Later, Wuchuan was one of the capitals of the Southern and Northern Dynasties. A tomb was found at Tuchenliang village, containing ancient coins, weapons, and many other bronze and iron artefacts. A Roman gold seal was unearthed at Touhao village and some Persian silver coins from the Sassanid Dynasty were discovered at Baidao Cheng village.  This indicates that during the period of the Northern Wei, Sui and Tang dynasties, a northern silk road existed, stretching from Xi'an to Datong to Huhhot and crossing Daqing Mountain to Wuchuan, eventually reaching the Middle East and finally Rome.

In 916, Wuchuan belonged to the state of Qidan(契丹). Archeological sites have also been found from the Yuan, Liao and Jin states. Some Song Dynasty coins were also unearthed. In addition, eight ancient tombs and seven ruins of towns from that period were discovered around the area of Dongtucheng along the river Qiangpan.

Climate

References

County-level divisions of Inner Mongolia